The Autoroute 4, abbreviated to A4 or otherwise known as the Esch-sur-Alzette motorway, is a motorway in southern Luxembourg.

Overview
The A4 was opened in six separate sections:
 1969: Pontpierre – Lallange
 1972: Leudelange-Nord – Leudelange-Sud
 1974: Merl – Leudelange-Nord
 1976: Leudelange-Sud – Pontpierre
 1988: Lallange – Lankelz
 1992: Lankelz – Raemerech

Route

References

External links

  Administration des Ponts et Chaussées

Motorways in Luxembourg